= Mocuellus =

Scientific classification
- Domain: Eukaryota
- Kingdom: Animalia
- Phylum: Arthropoda
- Class: Insecta
- Order: Hemiptera
- Suborder: Auchenorrhyncha
- Family: Cicadellidae
- Genus: Mocuellus; Ribaut, 1946

Genus of true bugs

Mocuellus is a genus of true bugs belonging to the family Cicadellidae.

The species of this genus are found in Europe, Central Asia and Northern America.

Species:

- Mocuellus aniarus Emeljanov, 1964
- Mocuellus caprillus
